In category theory, a branch of abstract mathematics, a tower is defined as follows.  Let  be the poset

of whole numbers in reverse order, regarded as a category.

In other words, a tower (of ) is a family of objects  in  where there exists a map
 if 
and the composition

is the map

Example 

Let  for some -module . Then  forms a tower of modules.

References
Section 3.5 of 

Category theory